Niamh O’Connor is a best selling crime novelist, true crime writer and journalist for over 20 years.

Life and work
Wicklow based writer O'Connor is a journalist for the Sunday World. She is the True crime editor there. She has also produced best selling books of high-profile crimes as well as Detective fiction with the central character of DI Jo Birmingham.

Bibliography

Non fiction
 The Black Widow (The O’Brien Press 2000)
 Cracking Crime (The O’Brien Press 2001)
 Blood Ties (Transworld 2009)
 I'm Sorry Sir (2015)
Plus seven stories of True Crime published by The Sunday World 2007 – 2013

Fiction
 If I Never See You Again (Transworld 2010)
 Taken (Transworld 2011)
 Too Close For Comfort (Transworld 2012)
 Blink (Transworld 2013)

References 

Irish women novelists
20th-century Irish people
21st-century Irish people
Irish journalists
People from County Wicklow
Living people

Year of birth missing (living people)